Pianissimo is a term in music dynamics meaning "to be played very softly."

Pianissimo may also refer to:

Pianissimo, a 1990 album by Suzanne Ciani
 Pianissimo, a part of the Requiem trilogy by Virgin Black

See also
 Giuoco Pianissimo, a chess opening
Pianissimo Peche, a brand of Japanese cigarettes made by Japan Tobacco
Now Pianissimo, an album in the Now That's What I Call Music! series
Italian words and phrases